Copelatus andreinii is a species of diving beetle. It is part of the genus Copelatus in the subfamily Copelatinae of the family Dytiscidae. It was described by Régimbart in 1905.

References

andreinii
Beetles described in 1905